Taringamotu railway station was a station at Taringamotu on the North Island Main Trunk, in the Ruapehu District and Manawatū-Whanganui region.

Goods traffic was reported to have started by November 1902. A station master was appointed in 1911. In 1920 he was working over 12 hours a day. In 1924 it was a 6th grade post. The stationmaster was withdrawn from 26 June 1926. Reports mention a caretaker being at the station in 1948 and 1951.

The name was changed from Taringamutu to Taringamotu after Alexander Young had described it as an error in Parliament in 1913.

In 1908 additions were made to the station buildings and a station house was built. By 1911 there was a shelter shed, platform, loading bank and a passing loop for 36 wagons. Electric lighting came in about 1936.

Timber was the main traffic, transferring from the Taringamotu Tramway, but the station also handled other goods, such as 122 tons of fertilisers in 1926.

In 1939 the line between Taumarunui and Taringamotu became the first in the country to get CTC, meaning that Taringamotu closed as a tablet station.

Passenger numbers rose rapidly until 1916, as shown in the table and graph below –

Taringamotu closed to all traffic from 16 April 1972. In 1974 the crossing loop was extended. The loop was closed on 9 March 1987.

There is now just a single track and a 2-span girder bridge over the Ongarue River.

Incidents 
The line wasn't fenced until 1909. In October 1905 a letter from 22 Māori farmers between Taumarunui and Taringamotu complained of the agreement to do so being broken, saying, "Fifteen horses have been killed, eight cows, and five pigs".

In 1915 the Ongarue River undermined a bank and two engines and a van, which had been moving very slowly, were overturned. One fireman had a minor hand, or head, injury.

Two goods trains crashed in 1943, with slight injuries to drivers and firemen.

Floods and slips closed the line nearby on several occasions. In 2015 the wooden bridge over the Ongarue River was replaced in concrete and mass stabilisation was applied to the nearby embankment.

References

External links 
 Timber mill in 1910

Ruapehu District
Defunct railway stations in New Zealand
Buildings and structures in Manawatū-Whanganui
Rail transport in Manawatū-Whanganui
Railway stations opened in 1903
Railway stations closed in 1987